At least two ships of the French Navy have been named Branlebas:

 , a  launched in 1907 and sunk in 1915
 , a  commissioned in 1938, seized by the United Kingdom in June 1940 and foundered in December of that year

French Navy ship names